Dino may refer to:

Prefix
 dino-, a common prefix in taxonomy, meaning "terrible", "formidable"
Dinosaur

People
 Dino (given name), a masculine given name and a nickname
 Dino (surname), a surname found in Albania and Turkey
 Diño, a surname found in the Philippines
 Dino (American singer), an American singer/songwriter

Arts and entertainment
 Dino (The Flintstones), cartoon pet dinosaur of animated TV series The Flintstones, voiced by Mel Blanc
 Dino (film), a 1957 film
 Dino: Italian Love Songs, a 1962 album by Dean Martin
 Dino (album), a 1972 studio album by Dean Martin
 Dino (Jessica Folcker album), a studio album by Swedish singer Jessica Folcker
 Dino: The Essential Dean Martin, a 2004 compilation album
 Dino (biography), a 1992 biography of Dean Martin by Nick Tosches

Businesses and organisations
 Dino Entertainment, a firm specializing in the compilation market of the late 1980s and early 1990s
 Dino (Polish supermarket), a Polish retail grocery chain

Transportation
 Ferrari Dino engine
 Dino (automobile), a Ferrari model
 Fiat Dino, a car that used Dino Ferrari's V6 engine
 Ganzavia GAK-22 Dino, a light utility aircraft

Other uses
 Dino, Switzerland, a place in the canton of Ticino, Switzerland
 Democrat In Name Only (DINO), a derogatory political term
 Lego Dino, a Lego theme

See also
 "Dino vs. Dino", debut single by Brazilian rock band Far from Alaska
 Danshoku Dino, ring name of Japanese professional wrestler Akiru Miyashita
 Al' Dino (Aldin Kurić, born 1970), Bosnian singer, songwriter and composer
 Dinos (disambiguation)
 Dyno (disambiguation)
 Deno (disambiguation)
 Deino (mythology)
 Deino (Pokémon)